Daniel Burrows (October 26, 1766 – January 23, 1858) was a United States representative from Connecticut. He was the uncle of Lorenzo Burrows who was a United States Representative from New York. He was born at Fort Hill, Connecticut where he pursued preparatory studies. He engaged in the manufacture of carriages and wagons at New London. Later, he studied theology and was ordained as a minister of the Methodist Church.

Burrows was a member of the Connecticut House of Representatives 1816–1820 and in 1826 and served as a delegate to the Connecticut constitutional convention in 1818. He was one of the commissioners to establish the boundary line between the States of Connecticut and Massachusetts. He was elected as a Democratic-Republican to the Seventeenth Congress (March 4, 1821 – March 3, 1823) but was not a candidate for renomination in 1822. After leaving Congress, he became a resident of Middletown 1823–1854. He was a surveyor and inspector of customs for the port of Middletown 1823–1847. He died in Mystic in 1858 and was buried in Elm Grove Cemetery.

References

1766 births
1858 deaths
Members of the Connecticut House of Representatives
Democratic-Republican Party members of the United States House of Representatives from Connecticut
Politicians from Middletown, Connecticut
African-American men in politics